Russell William Ochsenhirt (April 16, 1912 – October 4, 2002) was an outstanding scholar-athlete at the University of Pittsburgh. He played basketball for four seasons, serving as captain of the 1933-34 team. He was named to Liberty magazine's All-American first team in 1934 and was twice selected to the All-Eastern Intercollegiate honor squad. After he graduated with a degree in electrical engineering, Ochsenhirt moved to Akron, Ohio, where he took a management position with Goodyear Tire and Rubber. He also joined the Goodyear Wingfoots basketball team. He was captain of the 1937–38 squad, which won the championship of the National Basketball League, the forerunner of the National Basketball Association.

References

External links
NBL stats

1912 births
2002 deaths
Akron Goodyear Wingfoots players
American men's basketball players
Basketball players from Pittsburgh
Forwards (basketball)
Pittsburgh Panthers men's basketball players